Marcin Święcicki (born 17 April 1947) is a Polish politician and economist. He is a former deputy minister of economy, former minister for foreign economic relations as well as a former city mayor of Warsaw.

Early life and education
Święcicki was born in Warsaw on 17 April 1947. He graduated from the University of Warsaw. He attended George Washington University and Harvard University for postgraduate studies and received a PhD from George Washington University in economics.

Career
Święcicki was the secretary general of the Consultative Economic Council from 1982 to 1989. He served as deputy minister of economy and then minister for foreign economic relations from 1989 to 1991 in the cabinet led by Prime Minister Tadeusz Mazowiecki. In 1989, he was also elected to the Parliament and served for two terms, from 1989 to 1991 and from 1993 to 1996. He was the mayor of Warsaw between 1994 and 1999. Then he served as an advisor to the President of Lithuania Valdas Adamkus on economic reforms from 1999 to 2000. He was the director of economic and environmental affairs at the Organization for Security and Cooperation in Europe (OSCE) between February 2002 and 2005  In 2011, he was again elected to the Parliament.

He is the president of the support committee for the Museum of the History of Polish Jews and president of European Movement Poland.

Views and work
Although Święcicki was not a member of the Solidarity group, like other members of the Mazowiecki cabinet, he was acceptable to the group and had Solidarity-aligned economic views.

Święcicki is the author of several books which mostly focus on economics.

References

External links

20th-century Polish politicians
21st-century Polish politicians
1947 births
Civic Platform politicians
Columbian College of Arts and Sciences alumni
Democratic Party – demokraci.pl politicians
Democratic Union (Poland) politicians
Freedom Union (Poland) politicians
Government ministers of Poland
Living people
Mayors of Warsaw
Members of the Central Committee of the Polish United Workers' Party
Members of the Contract Sejm
Members of the Polish Sejm 1993–1997
Members of the Polish Sejm 2011–2015
Members of the Polish Sejm 2015–2019
Polish economists
Polish Round Table Talks participants
Politicians from Warsaw
University of Warsaw alumni